Aulops is a genus of insects belonging to the family Panorpidae.

Species:
 Aulops alpina
 Aulops plitvicensis

References

Panorpidae